Dyslexia susceptibility 1 candidate gene 1 protein is a protein that in humans is encoded by the DYX1C1 gene. This protein contains 420-amino acids with 3 tetratricopeptide repeat (TPR) domains, thought to mediate protein–protein interactions.

Clinical significance 

A mutation in the DYX1C1 gene has been associated with deficits in reading ability (dyslexia).

References

Further reading

Dyslexia research